"Straight Tequila Night" is a song written by Debbie Hupp and Kent Robbins, and recorded by American country music singer John Anderson.  It was released on December 2, 1991, as the second single from Anderson's album Seminole Wind.  It reached number-one on the country charts in the United States and Canada. It was Anderson's first number one song since 1983 and considered his comeback single.

The song was covered by Ashley McBryde on the 2022 John Anderson tribute album Something Borrowed, Something New.

Content
The song is a mid-tempo number in which the narrator is a person counseling a man in a tavern, who is regarding a frequent female patron, sitting by herself at a table ("Tonight, she's only sippin' white wine").  It is implied or assumed that she is typically much more open and outgoing when any other type of alcohol is consumed ("She's friendly and fun-lovin' most of the time."), except for "straight tequila"; this will have the effect of making the woman think about her ex-lover and cause her to become upset and agitated ("She'll start thinkin' about him, and she's ready to fight").

Chart positions

Year-end charts

References

1991 singles
John Anderson (musician) songs
Songs written by Kent Robbins
Song recordings produced by James Stroud
BNA Records singles
Songs written by Debbie Hupp
Songs about alcohol
1991 songs